21st Army may refer to:

21st Army (Wehrmacht)
21st Army (Soviet Union)
Twenty-First Army (Japan)
21st Army Group, Britain
21st Group Army, China